Niesky is a railway station in the town of Niesky, Saxony, Germany. The station lies on the Węgliniec–Roßlau railway, train services are operated by Ostdeutsche Eisenbahn.

Train services
The station is served by the following services:

regional service  Hoyerswerda – Görlitz

References

External links
 

Railway stations in Saxony
railway station